In alchemic and Hermetic traditions, suns are used to symbolize a variety of concepts, much like the Sun in astrology. Suns can correspond to gold, citrinitas, generative masculine principles, imagery of "the king", or Apollo, the fiery spirit or sulfur, the divine spark in man, nobility, or incorruptibility.  Recurring images of specific solar motifs can be found in the form of a "Dark" or "Black Sun", or a green lion devouring the Sun.

Sol niger

Sol niger (black sun) can refer to the first stage of the alchemical magnum opus, the nigredo (blackening).  In a text ascribed to Marsilio Ficino three suns are described: black, white, and red, corresponding to the three most used alchemical color stages.  Of the sol niger he writes:

The black sun is used to illuminate the dissolution of the body, a blackening of matter, or putrefaction in Splendor Solis, and Johann Daniel Mylius’s Philosophia Reformata.

See also

 Alchemical symbol
 Classical planets in Western alchemy
 Five Suns (mythology)
 Solar symbol

References 

Alchemical symbols